1,3-Diphenyltriazene is the organic compound with the formula PhN=N-N(H)Ph (Ph = C6H5).  It is a prototypical triazene, i.e. a compound with the functional group RN=N-NR2.  It is a pale yellow solid, prepared by the reaction of phenyldiazonium salts with aniline.  It is a planar molecule. The N-N distances are 1.287 and 1.337 Å.

References

Phenyl compounds
Azo compounds